Imphal Free Press is an English-language daily published in Manipur, India. Alongside the Sangai Express, it is one of the two most widely read newspapers of Manipur. The two papers are known as Manipur's only "good quality" newspapers, among approximately 40 papers in the state.

History
The original Imphal Free Press was owned by Sapam Nishikanta. In 1996 its editor Pradip Phanjoubam walked out with the name and started a new Imphal Free Press. Phanjoubam edits and owns the new Imphal Free Press ever since. Sapam Nishikanta continued publishing under the names Manipur Free Press that turned into the Sangai Express, now the main competitor of the Imphal Free Press.

In 2006, a faction of the Kangleipak Communist Party forced a ban of three months on the Imphal Free Press. On 11 November 2008 an Imphal Free Press editor, Konsam Rishikant, was assassinated.

References

English-language newspapers published in India
Imphal
Mass media in Manipur
1996 establishments in Manipur
Newspapers established in 1996